The Foja Range languages, or Tor–Kwerba in more limited scope, are a family of about two dozen Papuan languages. They are named after the Foja Mountains of western New Guinea.

Languages
All the languages had been part of Stephen Wurm's 1975 Trans–New Guinea proposal, but he did not recognize them as a unit, retaining Kwerba within Capell's 1962 Dani–Kwerba proposal, for example. Foley (2018) classifies the Orya–Tor and Kwerbic languages together, as Tor–Kwerba. Usher (2020) adds Nimboran and Mawes, naming the expanded family Foja Range, after the Foja mountain range that passes through all four branches of the family.

Orya–Tor
Nimboran
Mawes
West Foja Range (Greater Kwerbic)
Isirawa
Masep
Kapauri–Sause
Apauwar–Kwerba (Kwerbic)
Apauwar Coast
Kwerba

Typological overview
Even though grammatical gender is present in Tor-Kwerba languages, there is no overt gender marking on nouns.

Pronouns
Reconstructed proto-Tor-Kwerba independent pronouns are:

{| 
|+ Proto-Tor-Kwerba independent pronouns
!  !! sg !! pl
|-
! 1
| * ~ *|| *
|-
! 2
| *|| *
|}

Cognates
Reconstructed proto-Tor-Kwerba words that are widely distributed throughout the family (Foley 2018):

 * 'eye'
 * 'leg'
 * 'louse'
 * 'sky'
 * ~ * 'tree'

References

External links
Tor-Kwerba languages database at TransNewGuinea.org

 
Northwest Papuan languages
Language families